The 3rd Field Artillery Regiment (Mountain) is a field artillery regiment of the Italian Army, specializing in mountain combat. The regiment was raised in 1902 as 3rd Mountain Artillery Regiment to support the Italian Army's mountain infantry troops, the Alpini, with whom the regiment shares the distinctive Cappello Alpino. Both, the Alpini and the Mountain Artillery, distinguished themselves in World War I and World War II. The regiment is the highest decorated artillery regiment of the army, having earned two Gold Medals of Military Valour in World War II: the first for the unit's conduct during the Greco-Italian War, the second for its service with the Italian Army in Russia. Today the regiment is based in Remanzacco in Friuli-Venezia Giulia and operationally assigned to the Alpine Brigade "Julia". It is notable that Enzo Ferrari served in this regiment during World War 1.

History 
The unit was raised in the city of Conegliano on 21 August 1902 as "Mountain Artillery Brigade of the Veneto" with three batteries. On 5 July 1909 the brigade was disbanded and its batteries, along with six newly formed ones, entered the newly raised 2nd Mountain Artillery Regiment based in Vicenza. The regiment consisted of three brigades named "Conegliano", "Bergamo", and "Vicenza", which were joined on 1 October 1909 by the newly raised "Belluno" Brigade. On 17 July 1910 the brigades were renamed as groups.

The regiment was tasked to provide artillery support to the 5th, 6th, 7th, and 8th Alpini regiments and recruited in Veneto and Lombardy.

World War 1

With tensions rising the army expanded the mountain artillery and on 1 February 1915 the regiment transferred the depot in Bergamo with the Mountain Artillery Group "Bergamo" to the newly formed 3rd Mountain Artillery Regiment. Along with the depot and group, recruitment in Lombardy and the task to support the 5th Alpini Regiment passed to the new regiment. To compensate for the loss of the "Bergamo" Group on the same date the Mountain Artillery Group "Udine" was raised.

During the war the regiment's depots raised and trained the commands of two mountain artillery groupings, the commands of 13 mountain artillery groups, and 35 mountain artillery batteries, which were equipped with four 65/17 mod. 13 cannons each. Furthermore, five commands of siege groups, and 21 siege batteries were raised and trained by the regiment.

 The regiment raised the following mountain artillery groupings: 6° and 8°.
 The regiment raised the following mountain artillery groups: XVI (69th, 70th, 71st bty.), XXI (78th, 79th, 80th, 81st bty), XXIII (50th, 53rd bty.), XXVI (85th, 86th, 87th bty.), XXVIII, XXX (94th, 95th, 96th bty.), XLIX, LIII, LIV, LXI, LXIII, LXIV, and LXVII.

Note 2: The group's 56th Mountain Artillery Battery was not raised until November 1916 for lack of available 65/17 mod. 13 cannons.

Interwar Years - New Numbering 
Traditionally Alpini units had been numbered from West to East with the 1st Alpini Regiment being the most westward and the 8th Alpini Regiment being the most eastward. However as the 3rd Mountain Artillery Regiment had been raised last it found itself now in the middle between the 1st Mountain Artillery Regiment in the West and the 2nd Mountain Artillery Regiment in the East. To rectify this on 11 March 1926 the 2nd and 3rd mountain artillery regiments swapped numbers.

Cold War 
For its conduct and work after the 1976 Friuli earthquake the Mountain Artillery Group "Conegliano" was awarded a Silver Medal of Army Valour, which was affixed to the group's war flag and added to the group's coat of arms.

Current Structure

As of 2019 the 3rd Field Artillery Regiment (Mountain) consists of:

  Regimental Command, in Remanzacco
  Command and Logistic Support Battery "Maria Plozner Mentil"
  24th Surveillance, Target Acquisition and Tactical Liaison Battery "La Bella"
  Artillery Group "Conegliano"
  13th Howitzer Battery "La Lavine"
  14th Howitzer Battery "La Montane"
  15th Howitzer Battery "L'Ercolat"
  17th Fire and Technical Support Battery "La Dura"

The Command and Logistic Support Battery fields the following sections: C3 Section, Transport and Materiel Section, Medical Section, and Commissariat Section. The regiment is equipped with FH-70 towed howitzers and an unknown number of M56 105mm pack howitzers in the direct fire role. The 24th Surveillance, Target Acquisition and Tactical Liaison Battery is equipped with RQ-11B Raven unmanned aerial vehicles and ARTHUR counter-battery radars.

See also 
 Alpine Brigade "Julia"

External links
Italian Army Website: 3° Reggimento Artiglieria Terrestre (montagna)

References

Regiments of Italy in World War I
Regiments of Italy in World War II
Artillery Regiments of Italy
Field artillery regiments
Military units and formations established in 1909
Military units and formations disestablished in 1943
Military units and formations established in 1951
1909 establishments in Italy